Pedasí may refer to:

Pedasí District, a district of the Los Santos province in Panama
Pedasí township, Los Santos, a township within the Pedasí District